Gash may refer to:

Places
 Gash, Hormozgan, a village in Hormozgan Province, Iran
 Gash, Razavi Khorasan, a village in Razavi Khorasan Province, Iran
 Gash River or Mareb River, flowing out of northern Ethiopia

People
 Jim Gash (born 1967), president of Pepperdine University
 Lauren Beth Gash (born 1960), American politician and lawyer
 Michael Gash (born 1986), English footballer

Music
 Gash (Foetus album), 1995
 Gash (EP), an EP by Pram
 "The Gash", a song by The Flaming Lips from The Soft Bulletin

Slang
 Wound, a type of injury
 Colloquial term for the vulva
 British military slang (specifically from the Royal Navy and Royal Marines) for rubbish (garbage), or for something that is considered useless, broken or otherwise of little value

Other uses
 Gash (TV series), a 2003 British series presented by Armando Iannucci
 Gash Bell, a main character of the anime and manga series Zatch Bell!